
The Aerosport-Rockwell LB600 was a two-cylinder, two-stroke, air-cooled, horizontally opposed engine intended to power ultralights. It was developed in partnership by Aerosport and Rockwell International, based on a Rockwell-designed JLO snowmobile engine.

Specifications

Applications
 Aerosport Rail
 Calvel Frelon
 PDQ Aircraft PDQ-2
 Thor Duster

References
 Erikson, Jack. Horizontally Opposed Piston Aero Engines

Boxer engines
1970s aircraft piston engines